The 2011 Great Yarmouth Borough Council election took place on 5 May 2011 to elect members of Great Yarmouth Borough Council in Norfolk, England. One third of the council was up for election and the Conservative Party stayed in overall control of the council. At the same time as the election, the introduction of a directly elected mayor in Great Yarmouth was rejected in a referendum.

After the election, the composition of the council was:
Conservative 24
Labour 15

Background
Before the election the Conservatives ran the council with 24 seats, compared to 15 for Labour. 13 seats were being contested with Labour targeting Caister North and St Andrews, while the Conservatives were threatening Caister South and Nelson wards.

Election result
The results saw the Conservatives remain in control of the council, with no change in their majority. The Conservatives gained one seat from Labour in Caister South, but lost a seat back in St Andrew's by 54 votes. The successful Labour candidate in St Andrew's ward was Barbara Wright, the wife of the former Member of Parliament for Great Yarmouth Tony Wright. Meanwhile, Kerry Payne held the seat in Nelson for Labour, despite being challenged by the incumbent councillor Brenda Taylor, who ran as an independent after being de-selected by Labour.

Referendum on an elected mayor
At the same time as the council election Great Yarmouth held a referendum on whether to introduce a directly elected mayor. This came after the Labour councillors Michael Castle and Trevor Wainwright collected the necessary 3,500 signatures, 5% of the population of the area. However both the local Conservative and Labour parties opposed the introduction of a directly elected mayor, with the Conservative leader of the council, Barry Coleman, leading the campaign for a no vote.

The results of the referendum saw 15,595 vote no, as against 10,051 yes, with 291 ballot papers being spoilt, therefore the introduction of a directly elected mayor was rejected.

Ward results

References

2011 English local elections
2011
2010s in Norfolk